The 1992 Individual Long Track World Championship was the 22nd edition of the FIM speedway Individual Long Track World Championship. The event was held on 13 September 1992 in Pfarrkirchen, Germany.

The world title was won by Marcel Gerhard of Switzerland.

Final Classification 

 E = eliminated (no further ride)
 f = fell
 ef = engine failure
 x = excluded

References 

1992
Speedway competitions in Germany
Motor
Motor